Raul Andrei Rusescu (born 9 July 1988) is a Romanian professional footballer who plays as a forward for Liga II side Concordia Chiajna.

Club career

CSM Râmnicu Vâlcea
At age seven, Rusescu was spotted by Cristi Bora at a trial and brought to Râmnicu Vâlcea. As a youth, he tore open his calf when he fell out of a bus, and then, subsequently, he broke his tibia falling down on ice. While at the club, he was group teammate with later Steaua București colleague Mihai Costea. Although he went through the youth system of CSM Râmnicu Vâlcea, in 2005 the coach of the team, Adrian Furnică, decided that Rusescu did not have enough value and that he was not likely to grow.

Unirea Urziceni
In the summer of 2005, Rusescu was brought to Liga II side Unirea Urziceni under the command of Dan Petrescu. He had limited playing time in his first year with the team while they earned promotion to the Liga I.

His team now being in the first tier of Romanian football, Rusescu was loaned to Dunărea Giurgiu. Although not yet 18, he quickly became a starter and finished the season with 13 goals scored across all competitions. For the 2007–08 season he was again loaned out, to Liga II club CS Otopeni. He helped the club gain promotion to the Liga I by scoring 4 goals in 20 matches.

In his first year in Liga I with Unirea Urziceni, Rusescu helped his team win the 2008–09 league title, earning a place in the group stages of the UEFA Champions League. He finished the season with 5 goals scored in 23 games.

In the 2009–10 campaign, Rusescu scored 8 goals from 29 total appearances, helping Unirea Urziceni finish second in the league and gather eight points in the 2009–10 Champions League group stage.

After manager Dan Petrescu left the club, Rusescu was used as a winger and did not perform as well as before.

Steaua București
On 4 May 2011, the owner of Steaua București announced at a televised show that Rusescu has signed with the club. Rusescu made his Liga I debut with Steaua on 31 July against CS Mioveni, also scoring his first Steaua goal. In the next match, Rusescu scored his second goal for the club against Universitatea Cluj. He scored his first European goal for Steaua against Schalke 04 in the 2011–12 UEFA Europa League.

On 5 December, Rusescu scored two sensational goals against Steaua's arch-rival Dinamo București, assuring his club a win in a match named by the two club's supporters the Eternal Derby and ending Steaua's seven-year winless streak on Dinamo's stadium. He has been deemed a hero by the Steaua supporters and the press. In the next Europa League group stage match, Rusescu scored again for Steaua from a penalty kick, helping his club beat AEK Larnaca and qualifying for the round of 32. At the end of 2011, Rusescu was Steaua's most prolific goalscorer with seven goals in Liga I and two in the Europa League group stage.

On 7 March 2013, Rusescu scored from the penalty spot against Chelsea at the National Arena, to put Steaua 1–0 up in the Europa League round of 16. On 12 March, Rusescu scored a goal against Universitatea Cluj. He scored again, on 18 March, against Astra Ploiești in a game which finished 2–1, with teammate Paul Pârvulescu scoring the winning goal. On 8 April, Rusescu scored the second goal from the 4–1 victory against Sportul Studențesc.

Sevilla and loans
On 13 June 2013, Rusescu completed a move to Spanish La Liga club Sevilla, signing a five-year contract which included a €40 million release clause. On 20 August 2015, Sevilla announced that Rusescu had terminated his contract with the club.

At the end of 2013, Rusescu was loaned at Portuguese Primeira Liga club Braga, with an option to purchase outright. He made his Braga debut on 6 January 2014 in a 2–0 win against Arouca in the Taça de Portugal. On 10 January, he scored two goals for Braga in his Primeira Liga debut, a 3–0 win over Vitória de Guimarães.

On 1 September 2014, just one year after being sold by FCSB to Sevilla, Rusescu returned for a season-long loan.

International career
Rusescu is an ex-Romania U-21 international, earning seven caps and scoring two goals. He played in the 2011 UEFA European Under-21 Football Championship, losing in the play-offs against England.

Career statistics

Club

International stats

International goals

Honours

Club
CSM Râmnicu Vâlcea
Divizia C: 2004–05

Unirea Urziceni
Liga I: 2008–09

Steaua București
Liga I: 2012–13, 2014–15
Cupa României: 2014–15
Cupa Ligii: 2014–15

Individual
Gazeta Sporturilor Romanian Footballer of the Year: 2012
Liga I top scorer: 2012–13 (21 goals)

References

External links

1988 births
Living people
Sportspeople from Râmnicu Vâlcea
Romanian footballers
Association football forwards
Liga I players
SCM Râmnicu Vâlcea players
FC Unirea Urziceni players
CS Otopeni players
FC Steaua București players
LPS HD Clinceni players
La Liga players
Sevilla FC players
Primeira Liga players
S.C. Braga players
Süper Lig players
Ankaraspor footballers
Giresunspor footballers
Liga II players
CS Concordia Chiajna players
Romania youth international footballers
Romania under-21 international footballers
Romania international footballers
Romanian expatriate footballers
Expatriate footballers in Spain
Expatriate footballers in Portugal
Expatriate footballers in Turkey
Romanian expatriate sportspeople in Spain
Romanian expatriate sportspeople in Portugal
Romanian expatriate sportspeople in Turkey